One Western Visayas (a.k.a. GMA Regional TV One Western Visayas) is a Philippine regional news broadcasting television show broadcast by GMA Bacolod and GMA Iloilo. Originally anchored by Atty. Sedfrey Cabaluna, Adrian Prietos, & Kaitlene Rivilla, it premiered on August 27, 2018. Prietos and Rivilla currently serve as anchors.

Overview
Conceptualized by GMA Regional TV and GMA News and Public Affairs, the newscast, delivered in Hiligaynon language, covers the significant and comprehensive news reports from Western Visayas, consisting of Panay region (Iloilo, Aklan, Antique, Capiz, and Guimaras) and Negros Occidental (including Bacolod). It is also the second GMA Regional TV newscast to use the "ONE" brand, which was first used by One Mindanao. With overall master control from the GMA broadcasting complex in Iloilo City, it is anchored in a tri-presenter format from separate locations, with two presenters based in Iloilo City and one presenter in Bacolod.

One Western Visayas is also aired via satellite through relay stations GMA TV-10 Sipalay, TV-30 Kanladog/Murcia, TV-5 Roxas and TV-2 Kalibo. The program also has its international broadcasts through GMA News TV.

One Western Visayas is also re-aired for national viewers under GTV’s late night block "Regional TV Strip" on a weekly basis. It airs every Wednesday at 11:50 PM since May 20, 2020.

History
Launched on August 27, 2018, the newscast marks the return of GMA Iloilo as an originating station, three years after it was reduced to be a relay station of GMA 7 Manila due to mass layoffs and financial difficulties brought about by streamlining of GMA Regional TV's operations. This is produced by GMA Iloilo and GMA Bacolod stations which, before the initial closure of their news departments, aired separate news programs Ratsada 24 Oras (formerly Ratsada and 24 Oras Western Visayas) and Isyu Subong Negrense, respectively.

On March 18, 2019, GMA Bacolod opened its studio which is now used by the newscast.  Prior to the launching of its studio, reports and headlines from Bacolod and the rest of Negros Occidental were aired live from the GMA Bacolod Control Room.

On May 27, 2019, Atty. Sedfrey Cabaluna (also a then high-ranking officer at Department of Tourism Region VI) temporarily left the newscast. Despite that, the program still maintained a tri-anchor format when reporters Darylle Marie Sarmiento and Zen Quilantang took turns as his replacement.

On July 29, 2019, the newscast unveiled a minor revision of its logo, changing its font color to green, reflecting its co-produced national newscast GMA Regional TV Weekend News (later Regional TV Weekend News, now Regional TV News), which was launched on July 27. It was relaunched on August 12, adopting graphics and studio sets for Iloilo and Bacolod stations similar to its sister regional newscasts Balitang Amianan (now One North Central Luzon) and Balitang Bisdak. The newscast also opened its doors to audiences every Friday.

Atty. Sedfrey Cabaluna returned to the newscast on March 16, 2020, reuniting with co-anchors Rivilla and Prietos. Sarmiento and Quilantang meanwhile continued working for the newscast as regional correspondents.

From June 29, 2020 to July 10, 2020, the program expanded its coverage and carried over reports from Central and Eastern Visayas regions owing to GMA Regional TV's decision to temporarily suspend GMA Cebu's operations due to a COVID-19 outbreak in Cebu City.  With that, the newscast, in interim, was de facto named GMA Regional TV One Western Visayas-Balitang Bisdak newscast. It was filmed at the GMA Iloilo Broadcasting Complex, with headlines delivered in Filipino language. Cabaluna and Rivilla continued as anchors of the interim newscast, with Bobby Nalzaro of Balitang Bisdak joining in as a co-anchor three days later, temporarily replacing Adrian Prietos. Correspondents from GMA Iloilo and GMA Bacolod delivered their news in Hiligaynon while reporters from GMA Cebu used Cebuano. This incidentally marked a return of a multilingual newscast by the network since the first incarnation of GMA Davao's One Mindanao which used Cebuano and Filipino (which later switched to solely using Cebuano). The interim Visayas-wide newscast ended on July 13, 2020 as GMA Cebu resumed productions of its local programs, including Balitang Bisdak. The program also reverted its overall medium of delivery in the Hiligaynon language with Prietos returning to the newscast as a co-anchor.

Atty. Sedfrey Cabaluna left the newscast once again on September 24, 2021 to run for politics, and temporarily adopted the two-anchor format together with the other regional newscasts. Co-anchor Juan Manuel Dela Cena joined the anchor team on April 4, 2022 and stayed until June 10, 2022, reviving the three-anchor format for the newscast and three other regional newscasts.

Anchors

Present
 Adrian Prietos 
 Kaitlene Rivilla

Former
 Atty.  Sedfrey Cabaluna 
 Juan Manuel Dela Cena

Correspondents
 Joecel Huesca (Program Manager)
 Rudje Mar Sucaldito (Supervising Producer)
 Julius Belaca-Ol (Supervising Producer)
 Ashley Liza (Senior Desk Manager)
 Thessalonia Ordales (Senior Desk Manager)
 Aileen Pedreso (Bacolod correspondent and news producer)
 Zen Quilantang (Iloilo correspondent)
 Darylle Marie Sarmiento (Iloilo correspondent)
 John Sala (Iloilo correspondent)

Segments 
 Bae ng Bayan
 Balitang Barangay
 Batang Petmalu
 Bantay Presyo
 Breaking News
 Bongga!
 Fies-TA! 
 HIV Watch
 Iskul Ko 'To
 Hayop sa Balita
 Kapuso Barangayan
 Kapuso Barangayan on Wheels
 Kapuso Lodi
 Kapuso ng Kalikasan
 Kapuso Serbisyo
 Kwento ng Pilipino
 Lagaw Ta!
 Lakat sang Panahon
 Ipa-One Western Visayas mo!
 My Western Visayas
 Namit Gid!/Food Trip
 Nga'a Man?
 Ratsada Balita
 RTV Presents
 #SpreadKindness
 Sports Lang
 Tsapa Reports
 Viral na 'to!
 'Yan ang Pinoy!

References

External links
 

2018 Philippine television series debuts
Flagship evening news shows
GMA Network news shows
GMA Integrated News and Public Affairs shows
Television in Iloilo City
Philippine television news shows